Elijah Litana (born 5 December 1970) is a Zambian former professional footballer who played as a defender. He was part of the Zambia national team that reached the final in the 1994 African Nations Cup.

Litana spent five seasons with Al-Hilal, helping the club win the 1995–96 Saudi Premier League. He was sidelined from playing football after a firearm accident in July 2000.

References

External links

1970 births
Living people
Zambian footballers
Association football defenders
Zambia international footballers
1994 African Cup of Nations players
1996 African Cup of Nations players
1998 African Cup of Nations players
2000 African Cup of Nations players
Saudi Professional League players
Al Hilal SFC players
Zambian expatriate footballers
Zambian expatriate sportspeople in Saudi Arabia
Expatriate footballers in Saudi Arabia